Jean-Pierre Frey (born January 6, 1955) is a former Swiss racing driver from Baselgia, Medel (Lucmagn).  He competed in full seasons of the FIA Formula 3000 Championship in 1986 and 1987 but failed to qualify for a single race in a time when the series was incredibly competitive. Frey went to the United States to race in two CART Championship Car races in 1988 for Dick Simon Racing and two more for Euromotorsport in 1989.  He entered the 1989 Indianapolis 500 but his entry was declined due to a lack of experience.  His best CART finish was 13th place in his debut at Laguna Seca Raceway. Frey also participated in sports car racing, including the World Sports Car Championship, the 1985 and 1988 24 Hours of Le Mans, and the 1989 24 Hours of Daytona where he drove a Zakspeed prepared Ford Probe GT-Prototype with teammates Marty Roth and Albert Naon, Jr.

Racing record

24 Hours of Le Mans results

Complete International Formula 3000 results
(key) (Races in bold indicate pole position; races in italics indicate fastest lap.)

American open–wheel racing results
(key)

CART PPG Indy Car World Series

References

External links
Driver Database Profile

1955 births
Swiss racing drivers
Champ Car drivers
Living people
24 Hours of Le Mans drivers
International Formula 3000 drivers
World Sportscar Championship drivers

Bettenhausen Racing drivers
EuroInternational drivers